The European qualification for the 2013 World Men's Handball Championship, in Spain, was played over two rounds. The 2013 hosts Spain, the 2011 holders France and the 3 best teams from the 2012 European Men's Handball Championship, Denmark, Serbia and Croatia were qualified automatically for the World Championship. In the first round of qualification, 21 teams who were not participating at the European Championship were split into seven groups. The group winners and the remaining 11 teams from the European Championship played a playoff afterwards to determine the other nine qualifiers.

Group stage
The draw was held on July 3, 2011 at 12:00 at Brno, Czech Republic.

Group 1

Group 2

Group 3

Group 4

Group 5

Group 6

Group 7

Playoff round

Seedings
Following the main round of the 2012 European Men's Handball Championship was concluded, five of the sixteen participants earned an automatic spot for the World Championship, namely Spain (hosts), France (title holders), Croatia, Denmark and Serbia. The remaining eleven teams were split into two pots, with the 7 best ranked national teams in the first one, and the remaining four in the second one.

The drawing procedure was carried out on 29 January 2012 at the Belgrade Arena during the final day of the European Championship. Games are scheduled to be played on 9–10 June and 16–17 June 2012.

Matches

All times are local.

First leg

Second leg

References

External links
Eurohandball.com 

2011 in handball
2012 in handball
World Handball Championship tournaments
Qualification for handball competitions